The 1993 Navy Midshipmen football team represented the United States Naval Academy (USNA) as an independent during the 1993 NCAA Division I-A football season. The team was led by fourth-year head coach George Chaump.

Schedule

Personnel

Season summary

vs Army

References

Navy
Navy Midshipmen football seasons
Navy Midshipmen football